Matthew Hall (born 1884) was a Scottish professional footballer who played as an inside forward for Sunderland.

References

1884 births
People from Renfrew
Scottish footballers
Association football inside forwards
St Mirren F.C. players
Sunderland A.F.C. players
Clyde F.C. players
Alloa Athletic F.C. players
Third Lanark A.C. players
English Football League players
Year of death missing
Footballers from Renfrewshire
Scottish Football League players